Paul Leduc may refer to:

 Paul Leduc (film director) (1942–2020), Mexican film director

 Paul Leduc (politician) (1889–1971), politician and lawyer in Ontario, Canada
 Paul LeDuc (wrestler) (born 1939), Canadian wrestler